Cypraecassis rufa is a species of large sea snail, a marine gastropod mollusc in the family Cassidae. It is commonly known as the bullmouth shell or red helmet shell, and also as the cameo shell.

Distribution
This species is found off the southern African coast from northern KwaZulu-Natal and Mozambique. It is more common in Mozambique. It is also a common shell to find on the shores of Kenya.

References

External links

Cassidae
Gastropods described in 1758
Taxa named by Carl Linnaeus